The 2010 FIM PGE Polska Grupa Energetyczna Speedway World Cup Race-Off was the third race of the 2010 Speedway World Cup season. It took place on 29 July 2010 at the Speedway Center in Vojens, Denmark.

Results 

The Race-off was won by host team Denmark (48 pts), and they qualify to the Final. Sweden (47 pts) was quality also. The last two teams, Australia (36 pts) and Russia (19 pts) were knocked out of the competition, and were classified 5th and 6th place in World Cup. Only one rider did not participated in the Event One or Two (Andreas Jonsson replaced Daniel Nermark in Sweden team). Both "Jokers" (Povazhny in Heat 12 and Holder in Heat 15) finished 4th and scoring 0 points.

Heat details

Heat after heat 
 [59.2] Lindgren, Bjerre, Watt, A.Laguta
 [59.8] Ward, Davidsson, Klindt, G.Laguta
 [59.9] Zetterström, Schlein, Iversen, Povazhny
 [59.7] Jonsson, Pedersen, Batchelor, Gizatulin
 [59.7] Lindbäck, Holder, Andersen, Gafurov
 [59.3] Gafurov, Pedersen, Zetterström, Watt
 [59.8] Andersen, Jonsson, Ward, A.Laguta
 [60.3] Schlein, Bjerre, G.Laguta, Lindbäck (T)
 [60.6] Lindgren, Klindt, Povazhny, Batchelor (Fx)
 [60.6] Holder, Davidsson, Iversen, Gizatulin
 [61.4] Iversen, Watt, G.Laguta, Jonsson
 [60.3] Lindbäck, Pedersen, Ward, Povazhny (J)
 [60.5] Andersen, Lindgren, Schlein, Gizatulin
 [60.5] Gafurov, Bjerre, Schlein (TS), Davidsson
 [60.4] Klindt, Zetterström, A.Laguta, Holder (J)
 [61.0] Andersen, Watt, Povazhny, Davidsson
 [60.9] Zetterström, Bjerre, Gizatulin, Ward
 [61.0] Schlein, Jonsson, Klindt, Gafurov
 [60.7] Lindbäck, Iversen, Batchelor, A.Laguta
 [60.5] Lindgren, Pedersen, G.Laguta, Holder
 [60.3] Gizatulin, Watt, Klindt, Lindbäck
 [60.7] Gafurov, Iversen, Ward, Lindgren
 [60.5] Davidsson, Pedersen, Schlein, A.Laguta
 [60.8] Zetterström, Batchelor, Andersen, G.Laguta
 [60.8] Holder, Bjerre, Jonsson, Povazhny

See also 
 2010 Speedway World Cup
 motorcycle speedway

References 

RO